The Malta Standards Authority (MSA) is Malta's national standards body.

Organization
The MSA is a government agency under the Office of the Prime Minister. The MSA consists of two divisions. The Legal Metrology Division is responsible for inspection and verification. The National Metrology Institute (MSA-NMS) is responsible for maintaining measurement standards for Malta.

Metrology Institute
MSA-NMS is located at the Kordin Business Incubation Centre near Paola. As a national metrology institute, MSA-NMS is a member of EURAMET.

MSA-NMS has three goals.
 To provide a means of local knowledge transfer in the various measurement areas.
 To reduce the overall economic load for the acquisition of traceable measure in the same fields for all national stakeholders.  In the medium to long term, MSA-NMS will be a net cost saver for Maltese stakeholders.
 To facilitate the fulfillment of traceable calibration requirements for laboratories intending to become accredited.

MSA-NMS maintains standards and is able to perform calibrations in the following measurement disciplines:
 Temperature
 Humidity
 Mass
 Dimension

See also
 Malta
 Government of Malta
 List of technical standard organisations

References

External links
EURAMET
MSA Website

Government agencies of Malta
Standards organisations in Malta